Stefania Vitaliani (born 16 July 1975) is an Italian softball player who competed in the 2004 Summer Olympics.

References

1975 births
Living people
Italian softball players
Olympic softball players of Italy
Softball players at the 2004 Summer Olympics